William Lees (November 21, 1821 – February 3, 1903) was an Ontario farmer, merchant and political figure. He represented Lanark South in the Legislative Assembly of Ontario as an independent Conservative and then a Conservative from 1879 to 1890.

Lees was born in Bathurst Township, Lanark County, Upper Canada in 1821, the son of Scottish immigrants. He began work as a farmer, later building a sawmill and a gristmill. He was named a justice of the peace in 1852. Lees served on the township council, also serving as reeve and county warden. He also served as captain in the local militia. Lees was a Third Degree member of the local Masonic lodge.

Lees married Mary Playfair in 1844, then Margaret Ward in 1857, then Annie Irvine Laurie in 1868 and later Elizabeth Harriet Smith in 1886. He outlived his first three wives and is buried in the Elmwood Cemetery, Perth, Lanark County, Ontario. His eldest daughter, Sophia Elizabeth, married Peter McLaren, who later served in the Senate. His eldest son, William Robert, was one of the Founders of Pincher Creek, Alberta.

References

External links 

The Canadian biographical dictionary and portrait gallery of eminent and self-made men : Ontario volume (1880)
The Canadian parliamentary companion and annual register, 1880, CH Mackintosh

1821 births
1903 deaths
Progressive Conservative Party of Ontario MPPs
Canadian justices of the peace